Geeta Dutt (born Geeta Ghosh Roy Chowdhuri; 23 November 1930 – 20 July 1972) was an Indian playback singer and a famous Hindi and Bengali classical artist, born in Faridpur before the Partition of India. She found particular prominence as a playback singer in Hindi cinema. She is considered as one of the best playback singers of all time in Hindi films. She also sang many modern Bengali songs, both in the film and non-film genre.

Hindi film songs

1940s

1946

1947

1948

1949

1950s

1950

1951

1952

1953

1954

1955

1956

1957

1958

1959

1960s

1960

1961

1962

1963

1964

1965

1966

1967

1968

1969

1970s

1971

1972–present

Bengali film songs

Bengali Non-film songs

References

Dutt, Geeta